Genocide Organ is a German power electronics/martial industrial collective, formed in Mannheim, Germany in 1985. They are known for their brutal and controversial presentation in their music and attitude.

Many of the themes present in their music make reference to the Ku Klux Klan, the Third Reich and war. This insistence on these themes has led to accusations of being far-right extremists, they have denied these accusations in interviews saying: “We never say what we think, and we never believe what we say, and if we tell the truth by accident, we hide it under so many lies that it is difficult to find out”. Due to this attitude, the website Discogs has blocked the sale of a number of their albums.

Discography 

 Leichenlinie (1989)
 Save Our Slaves (1991)
 Mind Control (1995)
 Remember (1997)
 The Truth Will Make You Free (1999)
 Same (2003)
 In-Konflikt (2004)
 Under-Kontrakt (2011)
 Obituary of the Americas (2016)
 Civilization (2017)
 Movement (2019)

References

External links 

 Tesco Organisation Webpage

Musical groups established in 1985
Electronic music groups
Experimental music
Power electronics (music)
Industrial music groups